Automotive Holdings Group Limited was an Australian company specialising in automotive retail and logistics. It was established in 1952. AHG was listed on the S&P/ASX 200. As of February 2017, its largest shareholder was Nick Politis, who held a 22.8% stake through his shareholding in AP Eagers. John McConnell became managing director of AHG in 2016.

In 2019 AHG was acquired by Eagers Automotive and was subsequently delisted.

References

External links
http://www.ahg.com.au

Auto dealerships of Australia
Companies formerly listed on the Australian Securities Exchange
Retail companies established in 1952
Retail companies disestablished in 2019
1952 establishments in Australia
2019 disestablishments in Australia